This was the third edition of the tournament as an ATP Challenger Tour event and the first edition since 2012.

Juan Pablo Varillas won the title after defeating Facundo Bagnis 7–6(7–5), 4–6, 6–4 in the final.

Seeds

Draw

Finals

Top half

Bottom half

References

External links
Main draw
Qualifying draw

São Léo Open - 1
2022 Singles